Barnea Jaffa Lande (formerly Barnea & Co.) is a commercial law firm located in Tel Aviv, Israel.  

Its main areas of practice are corporate law, M&A, litigation, technology, capital markets and financial regulation, infrastructure and project finance, employment, real estate, tax, and wealth management. The firm’s senior partners are Michael Barnea, Simon Jaffa, Zohar Lande, and Dr. Zvi Gabbay.

Barnea Jaffa Lande is counted among Israel’s largest law firms by leading Israeli directory Dun’s100.

Notable Cases

 Acting as the Israeli counsel of the American investment fund Starboard Value in a 2017-2018 corporate battle over Mellanox.
 Advising Azrieli Group on its ILS 1.3 billion purchase of Mall Hayam in Eilat.
 Representing Espresso Club in a lawsuit filed against it by Nespresso alleging the prohibited use of advertisements in which George Clooney's double appeared. The ruling in this case was included in the list of significant rulings for 2019 published by the Israeli Supreme Court.
 Representing RGE in its dispute over the tender for operating the Knesset Channel. Barnea advised RGE vis-a-vis the Israeli Cable and Satellite Council and in its appeal to the Israeli Supreme Court. TheMarker chose this Supreme Court ruling as one of the five most important rulings in Israel in 2018.
 Representing Danel Group in its various transactions, including the purchase of Enaim Medical Center and Manor Medical.
 Representing Shift4 Payments in its USD 575 purchase of Credorax, a global payment provider.
Represented MobileODT against OrbiMed.

Rankings 
Barnea Jaffa Lande is ranked in The Legal 500’s Corporate and M&A, Employment, Infrastructure, Energy, and High-Tech practice areas. It is also ranked by Chambers & Partners for the practice areas Corporate and M&A, Employment, Projects and Energy, Fintech, and Private Wealth. IFLR1000, an international ratings directory, has ranked Barnea Jaffa Lande in the M&A and Project Financing categories.

References 

Law firms
Law firms established in 2003